Ontario is a city in southwestern San Bernardino County in the U.S. state of California,  east of downtown Los Angeles and  west of downtown San Bernardino, the county seat. Located in the western part of the Inland Empire metropolitan area, it lies just east of Los Angeles County and is part of the Greater Los Angeles Area. As of the 2020 Census, the city had a population of 175,265.

The city is home to the Ontario International Airport, which is the 15th-busiest airport in the United States by cargo carried. Ontario handles the mass of freight traffic between the ports of Los Angeles and Long Beach and the rest of the country.

It takes its name from the Ontario Model Colony development established in 1882 by the Canadian engineer George Chaffey and his brothers William Chaffey and Charles Chaffey. They named the settlement after their home province of Ontario.

History

Ontario was originally inhabited by only the Tongva Indians until Franciscans arrived developing the Spanish mission system.

Juan Bautista de Anza is said to have passed through the area on his 1774 expedition, and to this day a city park and a middle school bear his name. Following the 1819 establishment of San Bernardino Asistencia, which may have served as an outpost of the San Gabriel mission, it became part of a large, vaguely identified area called "San Antonio".

In 1826, Jedediah Smith passed through what is now Upland on the first overland journey to the West coast of North America via the National Old Trails Road (present-day Foothill Blvd).

The 1834 secularization of California land holdings resulted in the land's transferral to private hands. In 1881, the Chaffey brothers, George and William, purchased the land (which at that time also included the present-day city of Upland) and the water rights to it. They engineered a drainage system channeling water from the foothills of Mount San Antonio (colloquially known as "Mount Baldy") down to the flatter lands below that performed the dual functions of allowing farmers to water their crops and preventing the floods that periodically afflict them. They also created the main thoroughfare of Euclid Avenue (California Highway 83), with its distinctive wide lanes and grassy median. The new "Model Colony" (called so because it offered the perfect balance between agriculture and the urban comforts of schools, churches, and commerce) was originally conceived as a dry town, early deeds containing clauses forbidding the manufacture or sale of alcoholic beverages within the town. The two named the town "Ontario" in honor of the province of Ontario in Canada, where they were born.

Ontario attracted farmers (primarily citrus) and ailing Easterners seeking a drier climate. To impress visitors and potential settlers with the "abundance" of water in Ontario, a fountain was placed at the Southern Pacific railway station. It was turned on when passenger trains were approaching and frugally turned off again after their departure. The original "Chaffey fountain", a simple spigot surrounded by a ring of white stones, was later replaced by the more ornate "Frankish Fountain", an Art Nouveau creation now located outside the Ontario Museum of History and Art.

Agriculture was vital to the early economy, and many street names recall this legacy. The Sunkist plant remains as a living vestige of the citrus era. The Chaffey brothers left to found the settlements of Mildura, Australia and Renmark, Australia, which met with varying success. Charles Frankish continued their work at Ontario.

Mining engineer John Tays refined the design of the novel "mule car", used from 1887 for public transportation on Euclid Avenue to 24th Street. At that point, the two mules were loaded onto a platform at the rear of the car and allowed to ride, as gravity propelled the trolley back down the avenue to the downtown Ontario terminus. Soon replaced by an electric streetcar, the mule car is commemorated by a replica in an enclosure south of C Street on the Euclid Avenue median.

Ontario was incorporated as a city in 1891, and North Ontario broke away in 1906, calling itself Upland. Ontario grew quickly, increasing 10 times in the next half a century. The population of 20,000 in the 1960s grew 10 times more by 2007. Ontario was viewed as an "Iowa under Palm trees", with a solid Midwestern/Mid-American foundation, but it had a large German and Swiss community. Tens of thousands of European immigrants came to work in agriculture, and in the early 1900s the first Filipinos and Japanese farm laborers arrived, later to display nursery ownership skills.

Ontario has over two centuries of Hispanic residents, starting from the Californio period of Spanish colonial and Mexican rule in the 1840s. The first wave of Mexican settlers was in the 1880s brought as workers in the railroad industry (see traquero) and another wave from the Mexican Revolution of the 1910s. Mexican Americans resided in the city's poorer central side facing State Route 60 and Chino.

Geography
The total area is 0.13% water.

Climate
The climate of Ontario is influenced by BSh semi-arid conditions, with hot summers and mild winters. Santa Ana Winds hit the area frequently in autumn and winter. According to the Köppen Climate Classification system, Ontario has a hot-summer Mediterranean climate, abbreviated "Csa" on climate maps.

Demographics

2010
The 2010 United States Census reported that Ontario had a population of 163,924. The racial makeup of Ontario was 83,683 (51.0%) White (18.2% Non-Hispanic White), 10,561 (6.4%) African American, 1,686 (1.0%) Native American, 8,453 (5.2%) Asian, 514 (0.3%) Pacific Islander, 51,373 (31.3%) from other races, and 7,654 (4.7%) from two or more races. Hispanic or Latino of any race were 113,085 persons (69.0%).

The Census reported that 163,166 people (99.5% of the population) lived in households, 411 (0.3%) lived in non-institutionalized group quarters, and 347 (0.2%) were institutionalized.

There were 44,931 households, out of which 23,076 (51.4%) had children under the age of 18 living in them, 23,789 (52.9%) were opposite-sex married couples living together, 7,916 (17.6%) had a female householder with no husband present, 3,890 (8.7%) had a male householder with no wife present. There were 3,470 (7.7%) unmarried opposite-sex partnerships, and 384 (0.9%) same-sex married couples or partnerships. 6,741 households (15.0%) were made up of individuals, and 2,101 (4.7%) had someone living alone who was 65 years of age or older. The average household size was 3.63. There were 35,595 families (79.2% of all households); the average family size was 3.98.

The population was spread out, with 49,443 people (30.2%) under the age of 18, 19,296 people (11.8%) aged 18 to 24, 49,428 people (30.2%) aged 25 to 44, 34,703 people (21.2%) aged 45 to 64, and 11,054 people (6.7%) who were 65 years of age or older. The median age was 29.9 years. For every 100 females, there were 99.0 males. For every 100 females age 18 and over, there were 96.8 males.

The homeowner vacancy rate was 2.0%; the rental vacancy rate was 5.8%. 90,864 people (55.4% of the population) lived in owner-occupied housing units and 72,302 people (44.1%) lived in rental housing units.

During 2009–2013, Ontario had a median household income of $54,249, with 18.1% of the population living below the federal poverty line.

2000
As of the census of 2000, there were 158,007 people, 43,525 households, and 34,689 families residing in the city. The population density was 3,173.9 inhabitants per square mile (1,225.5/km). The racial makeup of the city was 47.8% White, 7.5% African American, 1.1% Native American, 3.9% Asian, 0.4% Pacific Islander, 34.1% from other races and 5.3% were from two or more races. 59.9% were Hispanic or Latino of any race.

There were 43,525 households, out of which 49.4% had children under the age of 18 living with them, 56.9% were married couples living together, 15.5% had a female householder with no husband present, and 20.3% were non-families. 15.1% of all households were made up of individuals, and 4.6% had someone living alone who was 65 years of age or older. The average household size was 3.6 and the average family size was 4.0.

In the city, the population was spread out, with 34.4% under the age of 18, 11.2% from 18 to 24, 32.4% from 25 to 44, 16.1% from 45 to 64, and 5.9% who were 65 years of age or older. The median age was 28 years. For every 100 females, there were 100.6 males. For every 100 females age 18 and over, there were 98.7 males.

The median income for a household in the city was $42,452, and the median income for a family was $44,031. Males had a median income of $31,664 versus $26,069 for females. The per capita income for the city was $14,244. 15.5% of the population and 12.2% of families were below the poverty line. 19.1% of those under the age of 18 and 7.6% of those 65 and older were living below the poverty line.

Economy

In the years following Ontario's founding, the economy was driven by its reputation as a health resort. Shortly thereafter, citrus farmers began taking advantage of Ontario's rocky soil to plant lemon and orange groves. Agricultural opportunities also attracted vintners and olive growers. The Graber Olive House, which continues to produce olives, is a city historical landmark and one of the oldest institutions in Ontario. Dairy farming is also prevalent, as it continues to be in neighboring Chino. Much of southern Ontario still contains dairy farms and other agricultural farms. However, the area is currently under planning to be developed into a mixed-use area of residential homes, industrial and business parks, and town centers, collectively known as the New Model Colony.

A major pre-war industry was the city's General Electric plant that produced clothing irons. During and after World War II, Ontario experienced a housing boom common to many suburbs. The expansion of the Southern California defense industry attracted many settlers to the city. With California's aerospace industry concentrated in Los Angeles and the Bay Area, the Ontario International Airport was used as a pilot training center. Today, Ontario still has a manufacturing industry, the most notable of which are Maglite, which produces flashlights. Manufacturing has waned, and Ontario's economy is dominated by service industries and warehousing. Major distribution centers are operated by companies such as AutoZone, Cardinal Health, MBM, Genuine Parts/NAPA, and Nordstrom.

Ontario is also home to Niagara Bottling, The Icee Company, clothing companies Famous Stars and Straps and Shiekh Shoes, Scripto U.S.A., and to Phoenix Motorcars, who employs over 150 employees in Ontario.

Top employers
According to the city's 2014 Comprehensive Annual Financial Report, the top employers in the city are:

Tourism
The Greater Ontario Convention and Visitors Bureau implemented a tourism marketing district and adopted an aggressive five-year strategic plan focusing on marketing initiatives to bring visitors to the region, build brand and destination awareness while enhancing the local economy.

Arts and culture
Ontario is home to three museums, the Ontario Museum of History and Art, the Chaffey Community Museum of Art, and the Ontario Police Museum.

Built in 1925, The Granada Theatre was leased to West Coast Junior Theater. By the 1940s, the theater had become part of the Fox West Coast Theater chain. The Granada Theatre was designed by architect L.A. Smith.

Ontario is also the home to the second largest consumer Quilt Show in the United States, Road to California. The quilt show books over 2,400 room nights and has a recorded attendance of over 40,000 attendees.

The Ontario post office contains two oil on canvas murals, The Dream depicting founder Chaffey with surveyors and The Reality which shows a view of the completed Euclid Avenue, painted by WPA muralist Nellie Geraldine Best in 1942.

Since 1959, Ontario has placed three-dimensional nativity scenes on the median of Euclid Avenue during the Christmas season. The scenes, featuring statues by the sculptor Rudolph Vargas, were challenged in 1998 as a violation of church-state separation under the California Constitution by an atheist resident, but the dispute was resolved when private organizations began funding the storage and labor involved in the set-up and maintenance of the scenery in its entirety.  To support the nativity scenes the Ontario Chamber of Commerce started a craft fair called "Christmas on Euclid".

The All-States Picnic, an Independence Day celebration, began in 1939 to recognize the varied origins of the city's residents. Picnic tables lined the median of Euclid Avenue from Hawthorne to E Street, with signs for each of the country's 48 states. The picnic was suspended during World War II, but when it resumed in 1948, it attracted 120,000 people. A 1941 Ripley's Believe It or Not! cartoon listed Ontario's picnic table as the "world's longest". As native Californians came to outnumber the out-of-state-born, the celebration waned in popularity until it was discontinued in 1981. It was revived in 1991 as a celebration of civic pride.

Sports

The Toyota Arena is a multipurpose arena which opened in late 2008. It is owned by Ontario, but is operated by SMG Worldwide. It is an 11,000-seat multi-purpose arena, the largest enclosed arena in the Inland Empire. Over 125 events are held annually featuring sporting competitions, concerts, and family shows.

The arena had been the home of the Ontario Reign, a former team in the ECHL, that called the arena home from 2008 to 2015. The Los Angeles Kings' affiliate played at the 9,736-seat Toyota Arena. In their debut season of 2008–09, they were second in the league in attendance, averaging 5856 fans per game. The Reign led the ECHL in average attendance in every subsequent year.

Ontario was the host of the 2010 ECHL All-Star Game. Ontario joined Stockton (2008), Fresno (2006), and Bakersfield (2011) as California franchises hosting the league's midseason showcase. The minor league All-Star Game reportedly generated more than $1 million into the local economy.

In January 2015, the American Hockey League, a minor league above the ECHL, announced that it was forming a new Pacific Division and would be replacing the ECHL Ontario Reign with a relocated team. The Kings relocated the Manchester Monarchs, a franchise they had owned and operated since 2012, and became the Ontario Reign beginning with the 2015–16 AHL season.

The Ontario Motor Speedway was located in Ontario, and held races for USAC, Formula One, NHRA, and NASCAR. It was demolished in 1980 after the Chevron Land Company bought the property .

Government

Local government
The city is governed by a five-member council.

According to the 2009 Comprehensive Annual Financial Report, the city's various funds had $399.4 million in revenues, $305.3 million in expenditures, $1,606.0 million in total assets, $317.6 million in total liabilities, and $412.4 million in cash and investments.

State and federal representation

Education
Ontario has five school districts: Ontario/Montclair Elementary, Mt View Elementary, Cucamonga Elementary, Chino Unified and Chaffey Joint Union in the City borders. There are also several private schools throughout the city as well as two private military schools. Ontario also has nine trade schools. The University of La Verne College of Law is located in downtown Ontario. National University, Argosy University, San Joaquin Valley College and Chapman University have a satellite campus near the Ontario Mills mall. Ontario Christian is located there. Gateway Seminary has a campus in Ontario.

Infrastructure

Transportation
The Ontario International Airport provides domestic and international air travel. Because of the many manufacturing companies and warehouses in the city, the airport also serves as a major hub for freight, especially for FedEx and UPS.

Because Ontario is a major hub for passengers and freight, the city is also served by several major freeways. Interstate 10 and the Pomona Freeway (State Route 60) run east–west through the city. Interstate 10 is north of the Ontario airport while the Pomona freeway is south of the airport. Interstate 15 runs in the north–south directions at the eastern side of the city. State Route 83, also known as Euclid Avenue, also runs in the north–south direction at the western side of the city.

The city maintains an Amtrak station which is served by the Sunset Limited and Texas Eagle lines. Ontario also has a Metrolink station off of Haven Avenue. It connects Ontario with much of the Greater Los Angeles area, Orange County and the San Fernando Valley. Public bus transportation is provided by Omnitrans.  Additional bus and rail connections to Los Angeles and elsewhere are available at the nearby Montclair station.

Cemeteries
The Bellevue Memorial Park is located on West G Street. Spanish–American War Congressional Medal of Honor recipient Frank Fulton Ross is buried there, as is George Chaffey, one of the two founders of the city.

Shopping
Ontario Mills is a major shopping mall in Ontario, while Cardenas, a supermarket chain specializing in Latin American cuisine, was founded in and is based in Ontario.

Notable people

Hobie Alter, pioneer surfboard maker and catamaran builder
Jeff Ayres, basketball player, NBA champion with the San Antonio Spurs
Rod Barajas, MLB player for the Los Angeles Dodgers and six other MLB teams
Madge Bellamy, actress
Jim Brulte, politician
Jason Bowles, stock car racing driver
Eudora Stone Bumstead (1860–1892), poet, hymnwriter
Henry Bumstead, Academy Award-winning cinematic art director and designer
Beverly Cleary, author and Newbery Medal-winning novelist (1984), The Luckiest Girl and memoir My Own Two Feet
Andy Clyde, actor, married in Ontario in 1932
Del Crandall, MLB player and manager, 11-time All-Star, member of 1957 World Series champion Braves
William De Los Santos, poet, screenwriter and film director
Joseph Dippolito, former underboss of the Dragna crime family
Landon Donovan, former Los Angeles Galaxy and USMNT player; born in Ontario, raised in Redlands
Prince Fielder, baseball player for the Texas Rangers
José Carrera García, professional footballer 
Ana Patricia González, winner of Nuestra Belleza Latina 2010 (Our Latin Beauty 2010) and currently appearing on ¡Despierta América!
Bill Graber, pole vaulter
Robert Graettinger, composer
Cle Kooiman, soccer player
Ryan Lane, actor
Nick Leyva, manager of the Philadelphia Phillies (1989–1991)
Christina "T" Lopez, singer, actress; former member of Latin girl dance-pop band Soluna
Sam Maloof, furniture designer and woodworker
Shelly Martinez, professional wrestler
Anthony Muñoz, 1998 Pro Football Hall of Fame inductee
Al Newman, former MLB player 
Douglas Northway, Olympic bronze medalist, swimming
Joan O'Brien, actress, graduate of Chaffey Union High School District
Charles Phoenix, pop culture humorist, historian, author and chef
Antonio Pierce, football player
Joey Scarbury, singer
Robert Shaw, conductor
Mike Sweeney, MLB player for Philadelphia Phillies, attended Ontario High School and led 1991 baseball team to undefeated record and state title
Bobby Wagner, football player, attended Colony High School; middle Linebacker for the Super Bowl champions Seattle Seahawks
Joseph Wambaugh, author
Frank Zappa, musician, Rock and Roll Hall of Fame and Grammy Lifetime Achievement Award

Sister cities
Ontario has five sister cities around the world. They are:
  Brockville, Ontario, Canada (since 1977)
  Guamúchil, Sinaloa, Mexico (since 1982)
  Mocorito, Sinaloa, Mexico (since 1982)
  Los Mochis, Sinaloa, Mexico (since 1988)
  Winterthur, Canton of Zürich, Switzerland
  Jieyang, China

See also

 Inland Valley Daily Bulletin (newspaper)
 Ontario and San Antonio Heights Railroad Company
 The Daily Report (newspaper)
 List of Mexican-American communities
 List of U.S. cities with large Hispanic populations
 Greater Los Angeles Area
 Inland Empire Metropolitan Area
 OVS (gang)

Notes

References

External links

 
 Ontario Chamber of Commerce
 

 
Cities in San Bernardino County, California
Incorporated cities and towns in California
Pomona Valley
Populated places in San Bernardino County, California
Populated places established in 1891
1891 establishments in California
Chicano and Mexican neighborhoods in California